Hrushivka is a village in Kupiansk Raion (district) in Kharkiv Oblast of eastern Ukraine, at about  southeast by south (SEbS) from the centre of Kharkiv city.

The settlement came under attack by Russian forces during the Russian invasion of Ukraine in 2022 and was regained by Ukrainian forces by the beginning of September the same year.

References

Villages in Kupiansk Raion